Hoseynabad (also Romanized as Ḩoseynābād) is a village in Sheshdeh Rural District, Sheshdeh and Qarah Bulaq District, Fasa County, Fars Province, Iran. At the 2006 census, its population was 461, in 117 families.

References 

Populated places in Fasa County